Oleksandr Bondarenko (born 22 January 1987) is a Ukrainian politician, economist, businessman and former Governor of Dnipropetrovsk Oblast.

Education 
He graduated from the Kyiv-Mohyla Academy (Economics and Entrepreneurship), qualification "Bachelor of Finance" (with honors) and "Finance", qualification "Master" (with honors). He is finishing PhD Finance programme at his Alma Mater.

A graduate of the Kyiv-Mohyla Business School numerous administration programs, the DYB Ukraine program, and the IEDC Bled School of Management.

He did an internship in Sweden under the Strategic Business Management (SIDA) private sector development program for top managers and public sector leaders in European emerging countries.

Bondarenko is a graduate of the Strategic Marketing Executive Program at the Kellogg School of Management at Northwestern University in Chicago, US.

He took part in the US Aid Parliamentary Internship Program in the Ukrainian Parliament  under the Finance and Banking Committee and completed the Young Leaders Exchange Program of the US-Ukraine Foundation in Washington D.C., US.

In October 2019, he took advanced training courses at the Ukrainian School of Government under the general short-term program "Organization of the activities of heads of regional state administrations in the context of reforms."

In October 2020 - finished his training at UCGA (Ukrainian Academy of Corporate Governance).

A graduate of the International Program of Public Administration at the University of Singapore - Lee Kuan Yew School of Public Policy.

Career 
Since 2021 –  Director of Bureau of Investment Programs. The organization deals with investments support, development of renewable energy and public-private partnership

2007-2008 - Assistant Chairman of the Finance and Banking Committee of the Verkhovna Rada of Ukraine (USAID Parliamentary Internship Program), Kyiv.

For 12 years he worked in a number of manufacturing companies, held leading positions. Among them are the British-Dutch concern Unilever, the Ukrainian-Bulgarian manufacturer PIRANA and the VERDANI plant.

Since 2017, co-founder and manager of several companies in the field of food and retail.

He is also a member of the Advisory Board in a number of Ukrainian companies in the Consumer Goods industry.

In 2019-2020 - Head of the Dnipropetrovsk Regional State Administration.

From December 2020 - Member of the Dnipropetrovsk Regional Council, member of the Budget Committee.

Head of the Dnipropetrovsk Regional State Administration 
September 13, 2019 - appointed head of the Dnipropetrovsk Regional State Administration.

On December 17, 2019, Oleksandr Bondarenko presented the program of the region's development strategy.  The main areas identified were airport construction, investment attraction, environmental programs to reduce air emissions, as well as repaired roads, schools, kindergartens and hospitals, SMART projects, the Euro- and Euro-Atlantic integration program and founding of new regional territorial communities. The presentation gathered more than 600 guests - leaders of communities and cities of the region, public activists, business representatives.

On September 16, 2020, construction of a new, modern airport in Dnipro began.

On November 30, 2020, the Office for European Integration of Dnipropetrovsk Region was inaugurated on the basis of Dnipropetrovsk Regional State Administration with the participation of Deputy Prime Minister for European and Euro-Atlantic Integration of Ukraine Olha Stefanishyna and Head of the  Matti Maasikas.

In 2020, within the framework of the regional project Construction 100+ under the leadership of Oleksandr Bondarenko, more than 70 facilities were completed - 17 schools, 5 small group houses, 22 ambulatories, 13 reception departments, 8 hospitals were repaired and 40 km of new water pipes were built.

The largest sports arena in the region, the Olympic Reserves, has been opened, along with Minister of Youth and Sports Vadim Gutzeit. The complex can host championships in 40 sports. This is the first sports complex in Ukraine of this level, where you can hold world championships, European championships and various international competitions.

Also on the initiative of O. Bondarenko, the project Comfort Territory was successfully implemented - 11 new parks and squares in the region and the first inclusive park for children in Kryvyi Rih.

4 bridges and 320 km of roads were repaired, in particular the highways Vilne - Gvardiyske, Ivanivka - Radisne, Vasylkivka - Mykolayivka, Prosyana - Velykomykhailivka.

In 2020, on the initiative of O. Bondarenko, within the framework of the program With Respect to Soldiers in Dnipropetrovsk region, the purchase of 67 apartments for participants of the anti-terrorist operation in the east of Ukraine was financed by regional and state funds.

In the local elections of 2020, he ran for the seventh constituency of the Dnipropetrovsk region in the regional council - he won the constituency and became a deputy of the regional council, a member of the budget commission.

On December 10, 2020, he resigned from the position of the head of the Dnipropetrovsk Regional State Administration, and was replaced by Valentyn Reznichenko.

Public and educational activities 
Member of the Board of the Association of Alumni of the Kyiv-Mohyla Academy. He is the initiator and founder of the grant to the best lecturer-graduate of the Faculty of Economic Sciences of KMA "INHERITANCE OF SCIENTIFIC ACTIVITY". Together with classmates of the Faculty of Economics of KMA founded the Fund of Scientific Publications and Business Trips for students and teachers of the Faculty.

Founder and head of the NGO "Association for Economic Development" - a platform that develops and implements programs of regional and national economic development, analysis and scientific aspects of the economy.

He is also a member of the Board of Trustees and a member of the Advisory Board of The Kharkiv University of Humanities' "People's Ukrainian Academy".

Oleksandr Bondarenko is a big supporter of the Invictus Games Ukrainian national team, which are designed to provide new opportunities for servicemen and veterans who have paid a high price for their devotion to their country and its people. He organized sports parachute jumps for the participants of anti-terrorist operation and people with disabilities.

Publications 
Government appoints new head of Dnipropetrovsk Regional State Administration

Oleksandr Bondarenko Slovo i Dilo
We need plants: where to start
What are the plants for in Ukraine
How much will it cost to a private investor to enter the Ukrainian space industry?
How much investments are needed to create an industrial park and when the profit is expected 
Oleksandr Bondarenko «On construction of the new airport in Dnipro»
Investment guide around the Dnipropetrovsk region

Awards 
Stipend of the Verkhovna Rada of Ukraine.
Fellow of the Ivan Puluj Foundation.
Fellow of the Raiffeisen Bank Aval Foundation.
Winner of all-Ukrainian business plan competitions.
The best student of the Faculty of Economic Sciences of KMA 2006, the Star of the Faculty.

Personal life 
Married, raising a daughter.

His parents are mathematicians, engaged in entrepreneurial activity.

Oleksandr's father is a Candidate of Technical Sciences, associate professor, for many years he was teaching at various universities in Kharkiv.

References

External links

1987 births
Living people
Politicians from Kharkiv
National University of Kyiv-Mohyla Academy alumni
Governors of Dnipropetrovsk Oblast
21st-century Ukrainian businesspeople
21st-century Ukrainian politicians
Independent politicians in Ukraine